The Paiute-Shoshone Indians of the Lone Pine Community of the Lone Pine Reservation (Timbisha (Shoshone) language: Noompai ) is a federally recognized tribe of Mono and Timbisha Native American Indians near Lone Pine in Inyo County, California. They are related to the Owens Valley Paiute.

Language
The Lone Pine Paiute-Shoshones traditionally spoke two different languages.  The Mono ("Paiutes") spoke the Mono language and the Timbisha ("Shoshones") spoke the Timbisha language, both of which were members of the Numic subgroup of the Uto-Aztecan language family.

Lone Pine Reservation

The Paiute-Shoshone Indians of the Lone Pine Community is a federal recognized tribe and reside on the reservation, the Lone Pine Indian Reservation in Inyo County, in central-eastern California, in the Owens River Valley on the eastern side of the Sierra Nevada Mountains. The reservation is  large. Approximately 350 of the 1400 enrolled tribal members live on the reservation. The reservation was established on April 20, 1939 through a land exchange negotiated between the Department of the Interior and the City of Los Angeles. In 1990-1, 168 out of 296 enrolled members lived on reservation.  As of the 2010 Census the population was 212.

Government
The tribe is governed by a five-person tribal council, who are as follows:
 Melvin R. Joseph - Chairperson
 Mary Wuester - Vice chairperson
 Stacey Mike - Secretary
 Janet Hansen - Treasurer
 Beverly Newell - Trustee

The Lone Pine Indian Community is headquartered in Lone Pine, California. They have their own public works department, environmental department, and tribal administration.

Education
The reservation is served by the Lone Pine Unified School District.

Notes

See also
 Mono traditional narratives
 Mono language (California)
 Timbisha language
 Population of Native California
 Population history of American indigenous peoples
 Native Americans in the United States

References
 Pritzker, Barry M. A Native American Encyclopedia: History, Culture, and Peoples. Oxford: Oxford University Press, 2000. .

External links
 Lone Pine Paiute-Shoshone Reservation, official site

Timbisha
Mono tribe
Shoshone
Northern Paiute
Native American tribes in California
Owens Valley
American Indian reservations in California
Indigenous peoples of the Great Basin
Federally recognized tribes in the United States